Hans von Schuch (19 June 1886 – 24 November 1963) was a German cellist and music educator.

Life 
Born in Niederlößnitz, Schuch grew up with his parents, the conductor Ernst von Schuch and the opera singer Clementine von Schuch-Proska, in his native town. He was a brother of the coloratura soprano Liesel Schuch-Ganzel and the soprano Käthe von Schuch-Schmidt. His daughter Clementine von Schuch (1921-2014) also became an opera singer.

Schuch studied at the Hochschule für Musik Carl Maria von Weber and was engaged as a violoncellist in Berlin, Vienna and Dresden. From 1915 he was active as a music teacher.

Schuch died on November 24, 1963, in Dresden at the age of 77.

Further reading 
 Erika Eschebach, Andrea Rudolph, Stadtmuseum Dresden (ed.): Die Schuchs. Eine Künstlerfamilie in Dresden. Sandstein Verlag, Dresden 2014, .

References

External links 
 

German classical cellists
German music educators
Hochschule für Musik Carl Maria von Weber alumni
1886 births
1963 deaths
People from Radebeul
20th-century classical musicians
20th-century cellists